Carlo Antonio Tavella (1668–1738) was an Italian painter of the Baroque period, active mainly in Genoa.

Biography
Tavella was born in Milan, the son of Domenico Tavella, a Genoese merchant, Domenico. He was initially the pupil of the painter Giuseppe Merati, then later of a painter by the name of Johann Gruembroech or Greuenbrech, also called il Solfarolo. Later in 1695, Tavella worked with the Dutch painter Pieter Mulier II (Molyn), also known as Cavaliere Tempesta or il Tempesta.

In the following years, Tavella worked as a landscape painter for Alessandro Magnasco and Domenico and Paolo Piola. He helped decorate Palazzo Franchi in Genoa. Tavella had daughters by of the name of Teresa  and Angiola (who was herself a painter). Among his other pupils was  Niccolò Micone, known locally as Lo Zoppo. He died in Genoa in 1738.

Sources

External links

1668 births
1738 deaths
Painters from Milan
17th-century Italian painters
Italian male painters
18th-century Italian painters
Painters from Genoa
Italian Baroque painters
18th-century Italian male artists